Willem Ritstier (born June 12, 1959) is a Dutch cartoonist. He is the winner of the 2017 Stripschapprijs.

References

Living people
1959 births
Dutch cartoonists
Winners of the Stripschapsprijs
Place of birth missing (living people)
21st-century Dutch male artists